Judge Dredd: Jihad is a Big Finish Productions audio drama based on the character Judge Dredd in British comic 2000 AD.

Plot
Mega-City One is scheduled to host the Global Justice Summit, a gathering of Chief Judges from all over the world.  Judge Dredd is in charge of the security detail, but faces a threat from a radical cult hidden in the city's slums, and a fanatical and ruthless disciple of Morton Judd.

Cast
Toby Longworth - Judge Dredd
Garrick Hagon - Jonah/Morton Judd
Teresa Gallagher - Chief Judge Hershey
Paul David-Gough - Judge Hogan
Jane MacFarlane - Pandora

External links
Big Finish Productions

2004 audio plays
Judge Dredd